Kanter is a surname. Notable people with the surname include:

Aaron Kanter, American poker player
Albert Kanter (1897–1973), Russian publisher and creator of Classics Illustrated and Classic Comics
Anita Kanter (born 1933), American tennis player
Arlene S. Kanter, American legal scholar
Arnold Kanter (1945–2010), American politician
Bernadette Kanter (born 1950), French sculptor
Buzz Kanter (born 1955), American editor and publisher of motorcycle magazines
Dan Kanter (born 1981), Canadian music producer and songwriter
Enes Kanter (born 1992), Turkish professional basketball player
Gerd Kanter (born 1979), Estonian discus thrower
Hal Kanter (1918–2011), American comedy writer
Jay Kanter (born 1926), American film producer
Jonathan Kanter (born 1973), American antitrust lawyer
Krista Kanter (1946–2009), Estonian radio journalist and politician
Martha Kanter, American education official
Max Kanter (born 1997), German cyclist
Ron Kanter (born 1948), Canadian liberal politician
Rosabeth Moss Kanter (born 1943), American professor of business

See also
Canter (surname)
Cantor (surname)
Ganter (surname)
Konter (disambiguation)
Julian P. Kanter Political Commercial Archive, depository for political television and radio commercials in the United States
Kantner, surname
Kantor (surname)